Xiphoceriana cristata is a species of grasshoppers belonging to the family Pamphagidae.

References

Pamphagidae
Insects described in 1887